Krzysztof "Krys" Sobieski is a retired Polish football (soccer) goalkeeper who played professionally in Poland and the United States, including ten seasons in the Major Indoor Soccer League.  He spent five seasons as the goalkeeper coach with the Dallas Burn of Major League Soccer.

Player

Club
In 1964, Sobieski began his career with Pogoń Wiskitki.  In 1969, he turned professional with lower division club Ursus Warszawa.  In 1976, he moved to Legia Warsaw, winning the 1980 and 1981 Polish Cup.  In the fall of 1981, Sobieski moved to the United States where he signed with the Pittsburgh Spirit of the Major Indoor Soccer League.  On May 19, 1983, the Spirit traded Sobieski to the Cleveland Force in exchange for Luis Alberto.  On July 14, 1985, the Force released Sobieski.  On August 20, 1985, he signed as a free agent with the Dallas Sidekicks.  In 1987, the Sidekicks won the league championship.  Sobieski retired on April 3, 1991, having played six seasons with Dallas.

International
In June 1977, Sobieski earned two caps with the Poland national football team in a South American tour.  The first came in a match against Chile and the second in a match with Brazil.

Coach
On October 17, 1989, Sobieski was named assistant coach of the Sidekicks, a position he held until January 28, 1990.  In April 1992, he was named the head coach of the Poland national futsal team.  He coached the team at the 1992 FIFA Futsal World Championship.  Between 2000 and 2005, he served as an assistant coach with the Dallas Burn of Major League Soccer.

References

External links
 MISL stats
 Dallas Sidekicks: Krys Sobieski
 Personal bio
 Interview with Sobieski (Polish)
 Legia: Krzysztof Sobieski (Polish)

Living people
1950 births
Dallas Sidekicks (original MISL) players
Cleveland Force (original MISL) players
Legia Warsaw players
Major Indoor Soccer League (1978–1992) players
Pittsburgh Spirit players
Polish footballers
Polish expatriate footballers
Poland international footballers
Futsal coaches
People from Żyrardów County
Sportspeople from Masovian Voivodeship
Expatriate soccer players in the United States
Polish expatriate sportspeople in the United States
Association football goalkeepers